Jon Heacock (born October 11, 1960) is an American football coach and former player. He is the defensive coordinator at Iowa State University. Heacock served as the head football coach at Youngstown State University from 2001 to 2009, compiling a record of 60–44. He was an assistant coach at Youngstown State for seven seasons (1991–1996, 2000) under Jim Tressel.

Playing career
A native of Beloit, Ohio, Heacock graduated from West Branch High School in 1979 and earned a bachelor's degree in health and physical education from Muskingum College in 1983. He participated in both football and track and field at Muskingum.

Coaching career

Assistant coach
After graduating from Muskingum in 1983, Heacock accepted a position as a graduate assistant defensive line coach at the University of Toledo. In 1984, he served on the football coaching staff at Steubenville High School, where he helped the team to an Ohio Division II State Championship.  Heacock then served as the defensive coordinator, defensive line coach, and secondary coach at West Liberty University from 1985 to 1987. The next two seasons, he was a graduate assistant on Bo Schembechler's staff at the University of Michigan, where he worked with both the defensive backs and special teams during a stretch in which Michigan won two Big Ten Conference titles and the 1989 Rose Bowl.  Heacock then moved on as an assistant coach at the United States Military Academy before joining the coaching staff at Youngstown State in 1991.

In his first year at Youngstown State, Heacock served as defensive backs coach as the Penguins finished 12–3 and won the Division I-AA national championship. During the next five seasons (1992–1996) he was promoted and served as the defensive coordinator. Youngstown State advanced to the I-AA title game for four consecutive years, winning in 1991 over Marshall, losing to Marshall in 1992, rebounding with a victory over Marshall 1993, and beating Boise State in 1994. Youngstown State finished 3–8 in 1995 and 8–3 in 1996, bringing the Penguins' record to 61–19–2 during Heacock's six-year stint as an assistant.  Heacock left YSU for a period of three years to serve as the defensive coordinator and defensive backs coach at Indiana University. He returned to Youngstown State in 2000 as the defensive coordinator.  His defense was ranked 15th in the nation in scoring allowed and the Penguins finished 9–3.

In 2013, Heacock left Kent State to take the Safeties Coach position at Purdue, following Darrell Hazell. In 2014, Heacock returned to the MAC when he was named the defensive coordinator for Toledo.

In January 2016 when Matt Campbell at Iowa State Heacock followed him to serve in the same position as defensive coordinator and safeties coach.

Head coach
Heacock was named Youngstown State's fifth head football coach on January 25, 2001 when Jim Tressel left to coach at Ohio State University.  The Penguins finished 8–3 in 2005, with a 5–2 record in conference that earned the program its first-ever Gateway Conference title, in a tie with Northern Iowa University and Southern Illinois University.  In 2006, the Penguins went 6–1 in the Gateway Conference to win the league title outright. For the seventh time in school history, the Penguins advanced to the NCAA semifinals, defeating foes James Madison University and Illinois State University before falling to top-ranked Appalachian State University. They finished with an 11–3 overall record.  Heacock was named the Gateway's Bruce Craddock Coach of the Year in 2005 and 2006. He was also named the American Football Coaches Association's Division I-AA Region Four Coach of the Year in both seasons and was a finalist for the Eddie Robinson Award.  On November 22, 2009, Heacock announced his resignation as head coach at Youngstown State.

Head coaching record

References

External links

 Iowa State profile

1960 births
Living people
Army Black Knights football coaches
Indiana Hoosiers football coaches
Iowa State Cyclones football coaches
Kent State Golden Flashes football coaches
Michigan Wolverines football coaches
Muskingum Fighting Muskies football players
Purdue Boilermakers football coaches
Toledo Rockets football coaches
West Liberty Hilltoppers football coaches
Youngstown State Penguins football coaches
College men's track and field athletes in the United States
High school football coaches in Ohio
People from Mahoning County, Ohio
Players of American football from Ohio